Phaq'u Tanka (Aymara phaq'u, paqu, p'aqu light brown, reddish, blond, dark chestnut, tanka hat or biretta, "chestnut coloured hat (or biretta)", Hispanicized spelling Pacotanca) is a mountain in the Andes of southern Peru, about  high. It is situated in the Moquegua Region, Mariscal Nieto Province, Carumas District. Phaq'u Tanka lies west of the mountain Qhini Jamach'ini and northwest of Qina Mich'ini and Arichuwa.

References

Mountains of Moquegua Region
Mountains of Peru